Östra Vemmerlöv is a locality situated in Simrishamn Municipality, Skåne County, Sweden

The well-preserved medieval Östra Vemmerlöv Church lies here.

Populated places in Skåne County
Populated places in Simrishamn Municipality